The 2022–23 East Carolina Pirates men's basketball team represented East Carolina University during the 2022–23 NCAA Division I men's basketball season. The Pirates were led by first year head coach Michael Schwartz, and played their home games at Williams Arena at Minges Coliseum as ninth-year members of the American Athletic Conference.

Previous season
The Pirates finished the 2021–22 season 15–15, 6–11 in AAC play to finish in ninth place. They lost in the first round of the AAC tournament to Cincinnati.

On March 11, 2022, ECU fired Dooley after four seasons. On March 16, 2022, the Pirates hired former Tennessee assistant Michael Schwartz as their next head coach.

Offseason

Departures

Incoming transfers

2022 recruiting class

2023 recruiting class

Roster

Schedule and results

|-
!colspan=12 style=| Non-conference regular season

|-
!colspan=12 style=| AAC Regular Season

|-
!colspan=12 style=| AAC tournament

Source

References

East Carolina Pirates men's basketball seasons
East Carolina
East Carolina Pirates men's basketball
East Carolina Pirates men's basketball